The Cheng'en Temple (Chinese: 承恩寺)  is a Buddhist temple located in Beijing, China.  It was first founded during the Sui dynasty, but later rebuilt several times, notably between 1510 and 1513 by the Zhengde Emperor of the Ming dynasty.  The temple's main Daxiong Palace, clock and drum towers, as well its stone sculpted Buddhas were all constructed during the Ming dynasty.  The temple also contains important collection of Ming dynasty Chinese religious art, such as the murals on the interior walls of the Hall of Heavenly Kings (Tianwang dian).

References

Buddhist temples in Beijing
Major National Historical and Cultural Sites in Beijing
Sui dynasty